Józef Ossoliński may refer to several members of the Ossoliński family:
 Józef Kanty Ossoliński (1707-1780)
 Józef Maksymilian Ossoliński (1748-1829)
 Józef Kajetan Ossoliński (1758-1834)